or PreCure All Stars is a series of Japanese anime films produced by Toei Animation based on Izumi Todo's Pretty Cure anime television franchise. Each movie features a storyline which crosses over characters from all the Pretty Cure anime series to date. As of September 2023, there are currently 14 main films in the series,
All Stars movies are generally released shortly after the premiere of a new Pretty Cure television series. The most recent Pretty Cure team at the time of release generally has the largest involvement with the movie's plot. In the opening scenes of each movie, a running gag occurs, in which the most recent Pretty Cure team bump into older teams by accident. On top of that, all fairies of all Pretty Cure teams know each other as friends.
With the exception of Singing with Everyone♪ Miraculous Magic!, each movie to date utilizes Miracle Lights, which are small flashlights handed out to audience members during screenings, with the finale encouraging viewers to wave their lights to support the Cures in defeating the main antagonist. The films often have a short segment instructing children on how to use their Lights safely. These Lights have also been made available for certain movies based on the individual series.

Films

Pretty Cure All Stars DX: Everyone's Friends - the Collection of Miracles (2009) 

 is the first crossover movie in the Pretty Cure series, released on March 20, 2009. It features all the Pretty Cures from Futari wa Pretty Cure Max Heart, Futari wa Pretty Cure Splash Star, Yes! Pretty Cure 5 GoGo! and Fresh Pretty Cure!.

Pretty Cure All Stars DX2: Light of Hope - Protect the Rainbow Jewel! (2010) 

 is the 2th in the crossover series, released on March 20, 2010, and stars all the Cures from the previous series, with the addition of those introduced in HeartCatch PreCure!

Pretty Cure All Stars DX3: Deliver the Future! The Rainbow-Colored Flower That Connects the World (2011) 

 is the 3th movie in the series, released on March 19, 2011, starring all the Cures from the previous series, including those introduced in Suite PreCure, as well as various villains featured in previous Pretty Cure movies and the last planned title in the DX series. The theatrical release was edited in parts as a result of the 2011 Sendai earthquake and tsunami which occurred before the movie was due to be released. The movie was later released on DVD and Blu-ray Disc on July 20, 2011, with the deleted scenes restored.

Pretty Cure All Stars New Stage: Friends of the Future (2012)

 is the 4th theatrical crossover film in the Pretty Cure series, which was released in Japanese theatres on March 17, 2012, starring all the Cures from the previous series, including those introduced in Smile PreCure!, and a movie exclusive Pretty Cure. The film was released on DVD and BD on July 18, 2012, and was aired as part of TV Asahi's Super Hero and Heroine Summer Vacation special on August 25, 2013.

Pretty Cure All Stars New Stage 2: Friends of the Heart (2013)

 is the 5th movie in the series,  and the sequel to New Stage which was released in theaters on March 16, 2013, and on Blu-ray Disc and DVD on July 26, 2013. It features all the present Cures including those introduced in DokiDoki! PreCure.

Pretty Cure All Stars New Stage 3: Eternal Friends (2014)

 is the 6th crossover film and the last planned title in the New Stage series, featuring the Cures introduced in HappinessCharge PreCure!. The film was released in Japanese theaters on March 15, 2014, and on Blu-ray Disc and DVD on July 25, 2014. This film celebrates the tenth anniversary of Pretty Cure franchise since 2004. Ayame Goriki starred as Nami in the third film of New Stage.

Pretty Cure All Stars: Spring Carnival♪ (2015)

 is the franchise's 7th crossover film in the series, released in 3D on March 14, 2015. It is the first feature length Pretty Cure film to feature extended dance scenes, similar to the 2011 short film Pretty Cure All Stars DX: 3D Theatre.
Like the six previous films, the film features the characters from all Pretty Cure television series, including those introduced in Go! Princess PreCure.

Pretty Cure All Stars: Singing with Everyone♪ Miraculous Magic! (2016)

 is the franchise's 8th film and the 20th film overall in the Pretty Cure franchise, featuring Cures from Witchy PreCure!. The musical film was released in Japan on March 19, 2016.

Pretty Cure Dream Stars! (2017)

 is the 9th crossover film in the series and the film. Unlike the previous films, the series does not feature every current Pretty Cure and instead focuses on characters from Go! Princess PreCure, Witchy PreCure! and Kirakira Pretty Cure a la Mode. The film, which features an original character alongside recent Cures, was released in Japan on March 18, 2017.

Pretty Cure Super Stars! (2018)

 is the 10th crossover film in the series. Like the previous film, the series also does not feature every current Pretty Cure and instead focuses on characters from Witchy PreCure!, Kirakira Pretty Cure a la Mode and Hug! Pretty Cure. The film, which features an original character alongside recent Cures, was released in Japan on March 17, 2018.

Hug! Pretty Cure Futari wa Pretty Cure: All Stars Memories (2018) 

 is the Pretty Cure movie celebrate the 15th anniversary of the franchise, the Hug! Pretty Cure team joins forces with the Futari wa Pretty Cure team to retrieve stolen memories of other Pretty Cure teams from an evil teru teru bōzu named Miden, was released on October 27, 2018.

Pretty Cure Miracle Universe (2019)

 is the 12th crossover film in the series. Like the previous film, the series also does not feature every current Pretty Cure and instead focuses on characters from Kirakira Pretty Cure a la Mode, Hug! Pretty Cure and Star Twinkle PreCure. The movie was released in theaters on March 16, 2019.

Pretty Cure Miracle Leap: A Wonderful Day with Everyone (2020)

 is the 13th crossover film in the series. Featuring the Cures from Hug! Pretty Cure, Star Twinkle PreCure and Healin' Good Pretty Cure, The movie was released in theaters on October 31, 2020.

Pretty Cure All Stars F (2023)

 is the 14th crossover film in the series, celebrate 20th anniversary of the franchise, The movie will be released in theaters on September 15, 2023.

Short movies

Pretty Cure All Stars: GoGo Dream Live

 is a 5-minute short released with the Yes! PreCure 5 GoGo movie DVD, featuring the cures from Max Heart, Splash Star and Yes! Precure 5 GoGo series working together to fight off a mysterious enemy. Ultimately, this has led to the establishment of Pretty Cure All Stars series today.

Pretty Cure All Stars DX: 3D Theatre

 is a 14-minute dance special shown in stereoscopic 3D, featuring a medley of songs from the series and movies, released on August 5, 2011. It consists all the cures from Cure Black to Cure Beat.

Movie-exclusive characters
 

 

, Masami Kikuchi (Final Form)

Video games
Certain video games in the Pretty Cure franchise produced by Bandai also feature cross-overs. Data Carddass arcade machines based on the franchise have been released since 2007, allowing players to use collectible cards. These machines are updated as new series are released. , released for Nintendo DS on October 30, 2008, is a side-scrolling beat 'em up featuring characters from Max Heart, Splash Star and Yes! PreCure 5 GoGo.  is a music game released for the Wii on March 28, 2013. The game allows players to dance to theme songs from all of the Pretty Cure series up to Dokidoki! PreCure.

Box office
Pretty Cure All Stars New Stage 2: Friends of the Heart grossed US$10.1 million. By April 20, 2014, Pretty Cure All Stars New Stage 3: Eternal Friends had grossed US$8,526,335 in Japan. Pretty Cure All Stars: Spring Carnival♪ grossed $1,073,800 on its opening weekend.

See also
List of Pretty Cure films - a list of films based on the individual television series

References

External links
Official Pretty Cure All Stars Website 

Film franchises introduced in 2009
Crossover anime and manga
Films set in Yokohama
Pretty Cure films
Bandai Namco franchises
Animated film series
Japanese film series
Films scored by Yasuharu Takanashi
Films scored by Naoki Satō